Marcelo Melo and Bruno Soares are the defending doubles champions. However this year they didn't participate together. Melo participated with Thomaz Bellucci, while Soares formed a team with André Sá.
Melo and Bellucci lost in the quarterfinals to Pablo Andújar and Carlos Berlocq. Soares and lost in the quarterfinals to Santiago Giraldo and Máximo González.
Frederico Gil and Daniel Gimeno-Traver took the title after defeating Andújar and Berlocq 1–6, 7–5, [12–10] in the final.

Seeds

Draw

Draw

References
 Doubles Draw

VTR Open - Men's Doubles